Ciletuh-Palabuhanratu Geopark is a national Geopark  at  Pelabuhan Ratu of Sukabumi Regency in West Java , Indonesia. It was recognized by UNESCO in 2015 as a national geopark. It was being proposed to become member of Global Geopark Network (GGN) to be recognized UNESCO by 2017.UNESCO has made  the park as a part of the Global Geoparks Network in April, 2018.

The park has land area of about 128,000 hectares. It is spread over 8 sub-districts and 74 villages of  Pelabuhan Ratu.

Attractions
The park is a popular tourist destination. Attractions of which are,
Puncak Darma-It is the highest point of the park.
Curug Sodong-waterfall
Curug Awang-Waterfall
Palangpang Beach
Bukit Panenjoan-hill
Curug Cimarinjung-waterfall
Palabuhanratu Beach
Lalay Cave Palabuhanratu
Palabuhanratu Thermal Baths

See also

Palabuhanratu
List of National Geoparks

References

I
 
Tourist attractions in West Java
Sukabumi Regency